The 11th Vuelta a España (Tour of Spain), a long-distance bicycle stage race and one of the three grand tours, was held from 26 April to 13 May 1956. Rik Van Steenbergen won the points classification and Nino Defilippis won the mountains classification.

The race was run with national teams of France, Spain, Switzerland and Belgium, and an additional four regional Spanish teams. Each fielded 10 cyclists, for a total of 90.

Teams and riders

Route

Results

References

 
1956
1956 in Spanish sport
1956 in road cycling